Chikodi  is a village in the southern state of Karnataka in Chikodi taluka, India. It is in the Chikodi taluk of Belgaum district in Karnataka.

Demographics
 India census, Shamanewadi had a population of 5,988 with 3,060 males and 2,928 females.
More than 90% are from Jain community along with Lingaayats and other communities. Most of the people depend on agriculture, it consists of rich sugar belt, as farming is a major activity of the area. The main crops are sugar cane, tobacco, jawar, and soyabeans. Almost on the bank of river Dudhganga. There are some groups in the village like Gandhi Katti boys, Jai Karnataka Yuval mandal, Jai Hind group, they  participate in social works/festival, etc.  

Its schools of higher education include Ayurvedic College, BEd, DEd and Arts and Commerce colleges in Shantinagar area.
Banks and Financial Societies
 State Bank of India
 The Ratnakar Bank
 Jai Jinendra Co-Op Credit Souhard Ltd
 Padmavati Minority Multipurpose Society
 Parshwanath Co-Op Credit Souhard Ltd
 Shamanewadi Co-Op Credit Souhard Ltd

Transportation
 Road
Shamanewadi is well connected by road via the State Highway 97 Sankeshwar - Sadalga and Chikkodi - Ichalakaranji road. NWKRTC run buses from Chikodi, Nippani to Ichalkaranji (Maharashtra) and Sadalga stops at Shamanewadi.
Rent on taxi and autos available here.
Nearest Railway Station 
Miraj
Nearest Airport 
Belagavi

Places

Temples
Shri Ramlingeshwar Temple
1008 Chandraprabhu Digambar Jain Temple  
Beereshwar Temple
Mallayya Temple
Brahmanath Temple
Yellamma Temple
Margubai Temple
Hanuman Temple
Vekteshwar Temple
Shamanameer Darga
padmavati Temple
Somanatah Temple

See also
 Belgaum
 Chikodi
 Districts of Karnataka

References

External links
 http://Belgaum.nic.in/

Villages in Belagavi district